Saleh Rabei (Arabic:صالح ربيع; born 4 May 1993) is an Emirati footballer. He currently plays as a goalkeeper for Al-Fujairah.

Career
Saleh Rabei started his career at Al-Fujairah and is a product of the Al-Fujairah's youth system. landed with Al-Fujairah from the UAE Pro League to the UAE First Division League in 2015-16 season. ended up with Al-Fujairah from the UAE First Division League to the UAE Pro League in the 2017-18 season. On 31 August 2018, Saleh Rabei made his professional debut for Al-Fujairah against Baniyas in the Pro League .

References

External links
 

1993 births
Living people
Emirati footballers
Fujairah FC players
UAE Pro League players
UAE First Division League players
Association football goalkeepers
Place of birth missing (living people)